Jordi López Felpeto (born 28 February 1981) is a Spanish former footballer who played mainly as a defensive midfielder, currently manager of Terrassa FC.

He achieved La Liga figures of 77 games and two goals over five seasons, representing Real Madrid, Sevilla, Mallorca and Racing de Santander and winning the 2005–06 UEFA Cup with the second of those clubs. He also played professionally in England, Wales, the Netherlands, Greece and Ukraine.

Playing career
Born in Granollers, Barcelona, Catalonia, López played for both FC Barcelona and Real Madrid's reserves to start his senior career. After appearing in five matches with the latter's first team in the 2003–04 season, he represented Sevilla FC for two years. With the Andalusians, he took part in ten games during the 2005–06 victorious run in the UEFA Cup and scored the only goal in an away win against FC Lokomotiv Moscow, netting his first La Liga one in the 3–1 victory at RCD Espanyol on 10 April 2005.

López moved to RCD Mallorca for 2006–07, being loaned the following campaign to fellow top-flight side Racing de Santander, where he was often used from the bench as the Cantabrians achieved a first-ever UEFA Cup qualification. He was subsequently released by Mallorca, and immediately started training with Portsmouth. However, on 19 August 2008, it was revealed he was having a trial with Blackburn Rovers also from the English Premier League; both spells were unsuccessful and he returned to the Balearic Islands, being left to train on his own for the first months of 2008–09 and cutting ties on 17 December.

In January 2009, López was expected to sign during the transfer window with Birmingham City of the Football League Championship, but failed his medical. The following month, he joined another club in the country and its second division, Queens Park Rangers, for the final 15 fixtures of the season, making his debut as a 69th-minute substitute for Matteo Alberti at Barnsley (2–1 loss). He scored his first and only goal for QPR in a 2–1 home win against Bristol City, on 21 March.

After some speculation, López agreed terms to join former Queens Park Rangers boss Paulo Sousa at Swansea City on 16 July 2009, subject to a medical. Four days later, he agreed to a two-year deal.

López failed to win a first-team berth during his two-season spell in Wales, also struggling with injury. On 13 January 2011, he terminated his contract by mutual consent and, the following day, signed for Eredivisie's SBV Vitesse coached by his compatriot Albert Ferrer, leaving five months later.

López then spent one year in the Super League Greece with OFI Crete F.C. and another in the Ukrainian Premier League with FC Hoverla Uzhhorod. The 32-year-old returned to his homeland subsequently, joining UE Llagostera of Segunda División B and helping them to achieve a first-ever promotion to the Segunda División in his debut season; in June 2015, he renewed his two-year contract for another season.

Before retiring in 2017 at the age of 36, López represented third-tier CE Sabadell FC.

Coaching career
López spent three years as assistant at UE Cornellà. On 21 June 2021, he was appointed manager of Segunda Federación club Terrassa FC.

Honours
Sevilla
UEFA Cup: 2005–06

References

External links

1981 births
Living people
Footballers from Granollers
Spanish footballers
Association football midfielders
La Liga players
Segunda División players
Segunda División B players
Tercera División players
FC Barcelona C players
FC Barcelona Atlètic players
Real Madrid Castilla footballers
Real Madrid CF players
Sevilla FC players
RCD Mallorca players
Racing de Santander players
UE Costa Brava players
CE Sabadell FC footballers
English Football League players
Queens Park Rangers F.C. players
Swansea City A.F.C. players
Eredivisie players
SBV Vitesse players
Super League Greece players
OFI Crete F.C. players
Ukrainian Premier League players
FC Hoverla Uzhhorod players
UEFA Cup winning players
Catalonia international footballers
Spanish expatriate footballers
Expatriate footballers in England
Expatriate footballers in Wales
Expatriate footballers in the Netherlands
Expatriate footballers in Greece
Expatriate footballers in Ukraine
Spanish expatriate sportspeople in England
Spanish expatriate sportspeople in Wales
Spanish expatriate sportspeople in the Netherlands
Spanish expatriate sportspeople in Greece
Spanish expatriate sportspeople in Ukraine
Spanish football managers
Segunda Federación managers
Terrassa FC managers